Wang Wei (1597–1647), also known by her courtesy name Xiuwei, was a Chinese courtesan, poet, and traveller during the late Ming dynasty.

Biography
Nothing is known of her family background. At age seven, when Wang's father died, she was orphaned. She was taken in by somebody in the brothel district of Yangzhou and trained to be a courtesan. The training included literacy and artistic skills. During this time she developed a friendship with another courtesan, Yang Wan, the two calling themselves "sworn sisters". Wang referred to herself as the "Straw-coated Daoist". As a courtesan she travelled by skiff between Suzhou and Kuaiji (now Shaoxing). The boat carried many books and she was often accompanied by well known literary figures of the day, including Zhong Xing and Tan Yuanchun, founders of the Jingling school of poetry. She also travelled to West Lake in Wulin (now Hangzhou), a hotspot for literati at the time, and as far as Hunan.

Wishing to change her life, she turned to Buddhism and started to travel, dressed in a simple cotton robe. During her travels she climbed to the peaks of mount Dabie, Mount Xuan, Mount Tianzhu, Mount Kuang and Mount Lu. After travelling she settled in Wulin. She intended to spend the rest of her life there and prepared a tomb for her eventual death. As the Ming dynasty began to crumble, the time became chaotic and Wang was raped in the early 1640s, after which she turned away from Buddhism.

Wang married a Censorate official, . Xu was a man of integrity, and was later dismissed from his post after disagreements with the Chongzhen Emperor. The couple were uprooted after Ming fell in 1644, and moved around the south. Although the couple vowed to live and die together, when Wang died of an illness in 1647, Xu lived on to mourn her.

Writing
Wang was a writer and anthologist of travelogues. Tina Lu has argued that nature was only the secondary topic of her work, with the primary focus being a, 'landscape of nostalgia,' that Wang used to express her identity as a traveller. She wrote several hundred travelogues. These may have been part of a commercial venture catering to the late Ming travel boom. One of her works, Ming shan ji (Records of the Famous Mountains), ran to several hundred chapters.

Her poetry appears in the anthology of late Ming-early Qing female poets Zhong Xiang Ci.

Wang's shi poems were described by Qing dynasty commentators as comparable to those of Li Qingzhao and Zhu Shuzhen in their beauty and serenity.

References

Notes

Works cited

External links
Wang Wei in the Ming Qing Women's Writings Database
Collection of Wang Wei's poems online

1597 births
1647 deaths
17th-century Chinese women writers
17th-century Chinese writers
Ming dynasty courtesans
Chinese travel writers
Chinese women poets
Ming dynasty poets
Poets from Jiangsu
Writers from Yangzhou